Honey Barbara is an American rock band from San Antonio, Texas.

Overview
The band is characterised by its distinctive sound. In reviews, its music has been described as progressive, moody, atmospheric and hypnotic. Combining this with its ethnic sound, the band could be regarded as a prime example of neo-psychedelica. The band's music has been released by the Emigre type foundry; the album I-10 & W. AVE. was part of issue 60 of the Emigre magazine, along with a magazine featuring typographic projects.

Honey Barbara “Wave Grass” (Gifted Amateur Recordings) released 11 May 2015.

The album "Wave Grass" finds the band Honey Barbara exploring a mix of pure instrumentals with a sprinkling of tracks that feature vocals.

The surprisingly close, tactile-and, then again dynamic-nature of the acoustic and electric instrumentation resonates well with wholesome sounds and deja-vu-like reverberations that reveal here a country, or there a psychedelic accent all woven in together.

Core members James Sidlo (guitars, etc.), Ross Marlow (vocals, keyboards), and Terry Orff (bass) are joined by Dan Tellez (formerly of Aqua Pedestrian) on guitar and Robert Potter (formerly of Pulsating Love Flower) on drums.

Additional musicians, as well, join the band on various tracks to further extend the album's sound.

Band members on "Reveries"
Current band members:
James H. Sidlo: electric and acoustic stringed instruments.
Ross Marlow: vocals, keyboards, bass and percussion
Terrence Orff: bass guitar
Dan Tellez: electric and acoustic guitars
Robert Potter: drums and percussion
Don Stewart: percussion

Band members on "Wave Grass"
Current band members:
James H. Sidlo: electric and acoustic stringed instruments.
Ross Marlow: vocals, keyboards, bass and percussion
Terrence Orff: bass guitar
Dan Tellez: electric and acoustic guitars
Robert Potter: drums and percussion

Past and present band members are:
James H. Sidlo: rhythm, lead, bass guitars and violin
Ross Marlow: vocals, guitar, keyboards and drum "de-programming"
Terrence Orff: bass guitar and guitars
Lisa Christine Kuehl: drums and other percussion
Lupe Ann Wilburn: bass guitar and violin

Discography

Albums
 FeedLotLoopHole (Emigre Records, 1993)
 I-10 & W. AVE. (Emigre, 2001)
 Wave Grass (Gifted Amateur Recordings 2015)
 “Reveries” (Gifted Amateur Recordings 2020)

Tracks also appear on Emigre music sampler releases.

References

External links
James Sidlo's website, includes an interview
Emigre issue 60, with information on I-10 & W. AVE.
A detailed review of I-10 & W. AVE.
The Muse's review of I-10 & W. AVE.

Rock music groups from Texas
Musical groups from San Antonio